, the common initialism for Super VHS, is an improved version of the VHS standard for consumer-level video recording. Victor Company of Japan introduced S-VHS in Japan in April 1987, with their JVC-branded HR-S7000 VCR, and in certain overseas markets soon afterward. By the end of 1987, the first S-VHS VCR models from other competitors included Hitachi VT-2700A, Mitsubishi HS-423UR, Panasonic PV-S4764, RCA VPT-695HF, and Toshiba SV-950.

Technical information
Like VHS, the S-VHS format uses a color under modulation scheme.  S-VHS improves luminance (luma) resolution by increasing luminance bandwidth.  Increased bandwidth is possible because of the increased luminance carrier from 3.4 megahertz (MHz) to 5.4 MHz.  Note also that the luminance modulator bandwidth is increased: in contrast to standard VHS' frequencies of 3.8 MHz (synch tip) to 4.8 MHz (peak white), S-VHS uses 5.4 MHz synch tip and 7.4 MHz peak white. Increased luminance bandwidth produces a 60% improvement in (luminance) picture detail, or a horizontal resolution of 420 vertical lines per picture height – versus VHS's 240 lines.  The often quoted horizontal resolution of "over 400" means S-VHS captures greater picture detail than even NTSC analog cable and broadcast TV, which is limited to about 330 television lines (TVL).  In practice, when time shifting TV programs on S-VHS equipment, the improvement over VHS is quite noticeable.  Yet, the trained eye can easily spot the difference between live television and a S-VHS recording of it.  This is because S-VHS does not improve other key aspects of the video signal, particularly the chrominance (chroma) signal. In VHS, the chroma carrier is both severely bandlimited and noisy, a limitation that S-VHS does not address. Lack of color resolution was a deficiency shared by S-VHS's contemporaries, such as Hi8 and ED-Beta – all of which were limited to 0.4 megahertz or 30 TVL resolution.

Regarding audio recording, S-VHS retains VHS's conventional linear (baseband) and high fidelity (Hi-Fi) – Audio Frequency Modulation (AFM) soundtracks. Some professional S-VHS decks can record a pulse-code modulation (PCM) digital audio track (stereo 48 kHz), along with the normal video and Hi-Fi stereo and mono analog audio.

As an added bonus, due to the increased bandwidth of S-VHS, teletext data (PAL) signals can be recorded along with the normal video signal.  As a result, this teletext data is also able to be decoded and displayed on-screen as an overlay of the conventional TV picture (though not on standard VHS machines).  A suitably teletext-equipped receiver/decoder (TV, PC card, etc.) displays the recorded teletext data information as if the video were being viewed as a real-time live broadcast.

Hardware
S-VHS video cassette recorders (VCRs) and cassette tapes are nearly identical in appearance and operation, and backward compatible with VHS. VHS VCRs cannot play back S-VHS recordings at all, but can record onto an S-VHS tape in the basic VHS format. Newer VHS VCRs, depending upon their specification, offered a feature called S-VHS quasi-playback or Super Quasi-Play Back, abbreviated to SQPB.  SQPB lets basic VHS players view (but not record) S-VHS recordings, though reduced to the lesser VHS quality.  This feature is useful for viewing S-VHS camcorder recordings which used either the full-size S-VHS videotape cassette or the smaller S-VHS-C videotape cassette.

Later model S-VHS VCRs offered a recording option called S-VHS ET, which allowed SVHS VCRs to record on VHS tape. S-VHS ET is a further modification of the VHS standards that permitted near S-VHS quality recordings on more common and less expensive basic VHS tapes.  S-VHS ET recordings can be viewed on most SQPB-equipped VHS VCRs and S-VHS VCRs.

To get the most benefit from S-VHS, a direct video connection to the monitor or TV is required, ideally via an S-Video connectors and/or S-Video enabled SCART.

Media
In order to take advantage of the enhanced capabilities of the S-VHS system, i.e., for the best recordings and playback, an S-VHS VCR requires S-VHS video tape cassettes.  These have a different oxide media formulation for higher magnetic coercivity. S-VHS video cassettes are sensed and identified by the video cassette recorder via a specific internal profile within a hole in the underside of the S-VHS video cassette body.

Videophiles were the first to theorize that since the only distinguishing feature of an S-VHS tape is a small 3 mm hole on the underside of the video cassette, it should be possible to use more common and inexpensive VHS tapes by duplicating that hole. However, S-VHS cassettes contain a higher grade and coercivity of tape stock to effectively record the higher video bandwidth offered by S-VHS.

S-VHS tapes are compatible with VHS VCRs, but an SVHS recording will not play back properly.

S-VHS ET
JVC introduced an S-VHS ET (Super-VHS Expansion Technology) system on its S-VHS consumer decks, allowing the use of normal VHS tapes for S-VHS recording, by slightly modifying the S-VHS recording specs, while still retaining compatibility, so that S-VHS ET tapes could be played with non-ET S-VHS VCRs. In S-VHS ET mode, the recording circuit is altered with: 
 Change of the W/D clip level (reducing the white clip level from 210% in SVHS to 190% in SVHS ET)
 Change of the main emphasis characteristics (changing the frequency responses)
 Change of the recording level (Y and C) and recording current

Limited success
Despite its designation as the logical successor to VHS, S-VHS did not come close to replacing VHS.  In the home market, S-VHS failed to gain significant market share. For various reasons, consumers were not interested in paying more for an improved picture. Likewise, S-VHS rentals and movie sales did very poorly.  A few pre-recorded movies were released to S-VHS, but poor market acceptance prompted studios to transition their high-end product from S-VHS to Laserdisc, and then onto DVD.

, consumer S-VHS VCRs were still available, but difficult to find in retail outlets.  The largest VCR manufacturers, such as Matsushita and Mitsubishi, gradually moved to DVD recorders, and hard-disk based digital video recorders (DVRs).  Combination DVD/VCR units rarely offered S-VHS format standard, only VHS.  In the mainstream consumer camcorder market, miniDV, DVD, and—eventually—solid state memory-based camcorders replaced S-VHS-C camcorders.  Digital camcorders generally outperform S-VHS-C units in most technical aspects: audio/video quality, recording time, lossless duplication, and form-factor.  The videotapes themselves are available, mostly by mail order or online, but are vanishingly rare in retail channels, and substantially more expensive than high-quality standard VHS media.

Videography
In the camcorder role, the smaller form S-VHS-C enjoyed limited success among home video users, competing with Hi8.

Full-size S-VHS was more popular in the amateur video industry, as it allowed for at least second generation copies at reasonable quality, which was necessary for editing. JVC, Panasonic, and Sony have sold industrial S-VHS decks for amateur and semi-professional production use.

A number of colleges and universities used S-VHS as a teaching tool for students, as the tapes cost less and offered more recording time than Betacam SP tapes, and yet students could still be trained on professional-level equipment.  In the US a number of local access TV stations, and in Canada local cable channels used S-VHS in the 1990s to record and playback local programs, such as city councils and Christmas parades.  For most of these stations, while the  U-Matics that they had been using were being phased out, but digital video was still years away, S-VHS was used to record from the composite setups that were still in place for U-Matic production.

Some public-access television stations and other low-budget cable TV venues used the S-VHS format, both for acquisition and subsequent studio editing, but the network studios largely avoided S-VHS, as descendants of the more expensive Betacam format had already become a de facto industry standard.

S-VHS vs ED-Beta
Shortly after the announcement of S-VHS, Sony responded with an announcement of Extended Definition Betamax (ED-Beta).  S-VHS was JVC's next generation video format designed to dominate the competing SuperBetamax format (which already offered better-than-VHS quality).  Not to be outdone, Sony developed ED-Beta as their next generation competitor to S-VHS.

In terms of video performance, ED-Beta offered even greater luminance bandwidth than S-VHS – 500 television lines (TVL)  of horizontal resolution per picture height, versus S-VHS's or Laserdisc's 420 TVL; putting ED-Beta nearly on par with professional digital video formats (520 TVL).  However, chroma performance was far less spectacular, as neither S-VHS nor ED-Beta exceeded 0.4 megahertz or ~30 TVL maximum, whereas NTSC broadcast has a chroma resolution of ~120 TVL, and DVD has a chroma resolution of ~240 TVL.  S-VHS was used in some TV stations for inexpensive "on the spot" camcorder capture of breaking news, however it was not suitable for multi-generational (studio) use.

In terms of audio performance, both VHS and Beta offered analog Hi-Fi stereo of outstanding quality.  Rather than re-invent the wheel, both S-VHS and ED-Beta re-used the AFM schemes of their predecessors without change.  Professional S-VHS decks did offer digital PCM audio, a feature not matched by ED-Beta decks.  In PAL markets, depth multiplexed audio was used for both formats.

In the U.S. market, the mainstream consumer market had largely ignored the release of S-VHS.  With the Betamax market already in sharp decline, a "format war" for the next generation of video simply did not materialize.  Sony discontinued the ED-Beta product line in the U.S. market after less than two years, handing S-VHS a victory by default, if it can even be called that.  (VHS decks continued to outsell S-VHS decks until the end of the VCR product life cycle.)

There is anecdotal evidence that some TV stations purchased ED-Beta equipment as a low-cost alternative to professional Betacam equipment, prompting speculation that Sony's management took steps to prevent its consumer (ED-Beta) division from cannibalizing the sales of its more lucrative professional video division.  Nevertheless, by the time of ED-Beta's introduction, VHS had already won a decisive victory, and no amount of competition on behalf of ED-Beta could regain the home video market.

Use for digital audio

In 1991, Alesis introduced ADAT, an eight-track digital audio recording system that used S-VHS cassettes. An ADAT machine recorded eight tracks of uncompressed audio material in 16-bit (later 20-bit) resolution. The recording time was one-third of the cassette's nominal playing time, e.g., a 120 min S-VHS cassette held 40 minutes of eight-track audio.

Studer produced the V-Eight (manufuctured and sold by Alesis as the M20)  and the V-Twenty-Four digital multitrack recorders. These used S-VHS cassettes for 8-track and 24-track digital audio recording, at a significantly lower cost than their DASH reel-to-reel digital recorders. The videotape transports were made for Studer by Matsushita.

See also
D-VHS
W-VHS
Video 2000

References

External links

Tape loading mechanism S-VHS VTR Telefunken A1200 — YouTube.com video
Tape loading mechanism S-VHS VTR Panasonic AG-4700 — YouTube.com video
Tape loading mechanism / dynamic drum S-VHS VTR JVC HR-S9500 — YouTube.com video
Formats — High-TechProductions.com
TVR Formats — LabGuysWorld.com

Products introduced in 1987
Videotape
VHS
Japanese inventions